Shambovo is a rural locality (a village) in Troitskoye Rural Settlement, Ust-Kubinsky District, Vologda Oblast, Russia. The population was 19 as of 2002.

Geography 
Shambovo is located 48 km northwest of Ustye (the district's administrative centre) by road. Popovskoye is the nearest rural locality.

References 

Rural localities in Ust-Kubinsky District